Mohammed Akbar or Muhammad Akbar may refer to:

 Mohammad Akbar Khan or Akbar Khan (1816–1845), Emir of Afghanistan and son of Dost Mohammed Khan
 Muhammad Akbar (Mughal prince) (1657–1706), Mughal prince
 Mohammed Akbar, Pakistani, former Guantanamo detainee (Internment Serial Number: 1011)